The Bangladeshi presidential election of 1996 was held on July 23, 1996. Shahabuddin Ahmed was elected after being nominated by the ruling party. He replaced Abdur Rahman Biswas when his five-year term came to an end. His inauguration ceremony was held October 9, 1996.

References

Presidential
Bangladeshi presidential election
Presidential elections in Bangladesh
Presidential election